Aung is a Burmese name. The meaning of "Aung" is Success (According to Burmese).

Notable people with the name include:

Aung Aung Oo (born 1982), footballer
Aung Khin (1921-1996), painter
Aung Myint (born 1946), painter and performance artist
Aung Pwint (born 1950), journalist
Bogyoke Aung San (1915-1947), revolutionary
Aung San Suu Kyi (born 1945), daughter of Aung San, politician
Aung Thu (disambiguation), multiple people
Htin Aung (1909-1978), author and scholar
MiMi Aung (born 1968), engineer and project manager at NASA's Jet Propulsion Laboratory
Min Ran Aung (1485-1494), king of Arakan
Zeya Aung (active from 2012), Minister of Energy

Surnames of Burmese origin
Burmese-language surnames
Burmese-language given names